Noemi García Ramírez is a professor and researcher with the Monterrey Institute of Technology and Higher Studies, Campus Monterrey. Her research work in biology and chemistry has been recognized by Mexico's Sistema Nacional de Investigadores with Level II membership.

References

See also
List of Monterrey Institute of Technology and Higher Education faculty

Academic staff of the Monterrey Institute of Technology and Higher Education
Living people
Year of birth missing (living people)